Jacob Pebley (born September 17, 1993) is an American competition swimmer who specializes in the backstroke. He will be representing DC Trident in the International Swimming League during the 2020 season.

In college, he was an NCAA runner-up in the 200-yard backstroke.

Pebley won the 200-meter backstroke at the 2015 Summer Universiade.

In the 200-meter backstroke, Pebley finished 2nd at the 2016 United States Olympic Trials to qualify for the 2016 Olympics.

Personal life
Jacob Pebley was born September 17, 1993 to parents Walter Pebley and Cathy Worth Pebley in Albany, Oregon. In 2006, Pebley lost his mother to cancer as he was entering 7th grade. The two and a half year battle he saw his mother endure inspired him to live with the same determination and compassion.

His parents, Walt Pebley and Cheslah Barkdol, along with his brothers Luke Pebley, Eric Young, sisters Katie Young, Noel Young and Hali Barkdoll are part of his support team.

Growing up, Pebley swam for the Corvallis Aquatic Team under coach Rick Guenther and attended Crescent Valley High School prior to moving to the University of California.

College Swimming

2012-2013 

Coming out of high school as one of the top male recruits, Pebley committed to the University of California, Berkeley to swim under head coach Dave Durden. During his freshman year, Pebley made quite the name for himself finishing with Cal’s third-best all-time swim in the 200-yard backstroke with a time of 1:41.62, and Cal’s tenth-best all-time swim in the 100-yard backstroke with a time of 47.22. Pebley qualified to swim at the 2013 NCAA Championships in the 200-yard IM, the 100-yard backstroke, and the 200-yard backstroke. Pebley even swam as a member of Cal’s medley relays. He finished the 2013 NCAA’s with a 40th-place finish in the 200-yard IM, a seventh-place finish in the 100-yard backstroke, and a third-place finish in the 200-yard backstroke. Pebley also swam as a member of the prelims 400-yard medley relay that went on to place second in finals.

2013-2014 

At the 2014 Pac-12 Championships, Pebley’s sophomore season, he finished 12th in the 200-yard individual medley (1:45.70), third in the 100-yard backstroke (46.34),  and second in the 200-yard backstroke (1:40.38). Pebley went on to the NCAA Championships to place fifth in the 400-yard medley relay (3:06.49- BK split 46.40), 11th in the 100-yard backstroke (46.09), and fourth in the 200-yard backstroke (1:39.59).

2014-2015 

In his junior year at the 2015 Pac-12 Championships, he finished 11th in the 200 IM, 5th in the 100 back, and 3rd in the 200 back. At the 2015 NCAA Championships, Pebley swam the 100 and 200 yard backstroke and 200 IM. His best finish was sixth in the 200 yard backstroke.

2015-2016 

Pebley saved his best season for his last season as a Cal Bear. At the NCAA Championships he finished second in the 200 yard backstroke, beaten only by his Cal teammate Ryan Murphy. He added points with a sixth place in the 100 yard backstroke and in the 200 IM ‘B’ final.

National and International Swimming

2010 Jr Pan Pacific Championships

Pebley was named to the 2009-2010 US Junior National Team, his first national team, for the 200-meter backstroke. As a member of the Junior National Team, Pebley competed at the 2010 Junior Pan Pacific Championships. At the 2010 Pan Pacs, he finished second in the 100-meter backstroke, third in the 200-meter backstroke, and fifth in the 200-meter IM.

2011 Jr World Championships

In the 2010-2011 year, Pebley was named to his second Junior National Team, this time for the 100-meter backstroke and the 200-meter backstroke. Pebley attended the 2011 World Junior Championships representing team USA. At Worlds, Pebley won three gold medals in the 100-meter backstroke (55.01), the 200-meter backstroke (1:58.73 – meet record), and as a member of the 400-meter medley relay. Pebley also took home a silver medal in the 50-meter backstroke (25.75).

2012 Olympic Trials/US Open

The following year, Pebley was named to the 2011-2012 US Junior National Team, his third Junior National team. In 2012, Pebley qualified for his first US Olympic Trials, held in Omaha, Nebraska. Pebley left the trials with a 16th-place in the 100-meter backstroke (55.48) and a seventh-place in the 200-meter backstroke (1:59.46). After disappointment over the time add and missing the Olympic team, Pebley refocused his goals towards the 2012 US Open at the end of the summer. At the 2012 US Open, Pebley took first in the 200-meter backstroke (1:57.57) and second in the 100-meter backstroke (54.49). His performances at the US Open earned Pebley a spot on the 2013 US World University Games Team.

2013 World Champ Trials/World University Games

Pebley was named to the 2012-2013 US National Team the next year for his performance in the 200-meter backstroke, making it Pebley’s fourth consecutive US National Team. Pebley competed for a shot on the World Championship team at the 2013 World Championship Trials (Phillips 66 National Championships). Pebley missed a spot on the World Championship team finishing ninth in the 50-meter backstroke, sixth in the 100-meter backstroke, and fourth in the 200-meter backstroke. Later that year, Pebley competed at the World University Games representing the US. Pebley came home from the games with three bronze medals in the 100-meter backstroke, the 200-meter backstroke, and the 400-meter medley relay (prelims).

2014 Phillips 66 Nationals/Pan Pacific Championships

For the fifth, consecutive year, Pebley was named a member of the US National Team, the 2013-2014 US National Team, representing Team USA as a 200-meter backstroker. At the 2014 Phillips 66 National Championships Pebley finished  5th in the 100-meter backstroke with a time of 53.90 and fourth in the 200-meter backstroke with a time of 1:56.68. His top-six performances in the 100 and 200-meter backstroke earned Pebley a spot on his sixth, consecutive US National Team Roster for 2014-2015. Shortly after Nationals, Pebley traveled to Gold Coast, Australia for the 2014 Pan Pacific Championships. Pebley finished the meet with a 1:58.46 200-meter backstroke and a 54.57 100-meter backstroke.

2015 World University Games

In South Korea, Pebley finished more than a second faster than the rest of the field to take the 200 meter backstroke title. His time of 1:56.29 was forth fastest in the world so far in 2015. In the 100 he finished 4th.

2016 U.S Olympic Trials

Not much can top qualifying for your first Olympics, but doing so with your teammate might. Pebley finished second in the 200 meter backstroke behind his Cal teammate Ryan Murphy to punch his ticket to Rio. The pair made their Olympic debut together.

2016 Rio Olympics

In Rio, Pebley finished 5th in the 200 meter backstroke in 1:55.52. Three lanes over, his teammate Murphy raced to the gold medal.

Pebley Pro-Life

Pebley officially signed a professional contract with TYR Sport, December 5th 2016. Oregon native Pebley was a natural fit for non-swimming brands like Portland Gear (apparel) and Bliss Nut Butter (health and wellness). Oregon has always been close to Jacob’s heart, as he often enjoys trips to the Rogue River with his family and even chose that location to propose to his long time girlfriend, Nikki.

2017 U.S. Nationals/World Championship Trials

Pebley qualified for his first World Championships after finishing 2nd in the 200 meter backstroke in 1:54.78 behind his Olympic teammate, Ryan Murphy.

2017 World Championships

At his first World Championships Pebley won a bronze medal in his only event, the 200 meter backstroke. He touched in 1:55.06 behind his compatriot Ryan Murphy. Russia’s Evgeny Rylov took the gold.

2018 U.S. National Championships

Pebley was runnerup in the 200 backstroke (1:55.68) at the 2018 Phillips 66 National Championships. He also finished fifth in the 100 back (54.05)

References

External links
 
 
 
 
 

1993 births
Living people
American male backstroke swimmers
California Golden Bears men's swimmers
Swimmers at the 2016 Summer Olympics
Olympic swimmers of the United States
Sportspeople from Corvallis, Oregon
Swimmers from Oregon
Medalists at the FINA World Swimming Championships (25 m)
Universiade medalists in swimming
World Aquatics Championships medalists in swimming
Universiade gold medalists for the United States
Universiade bronze medalists for the United States
Medalists at the 2013 Summer Universiade
Medalists at the 2015 Summer Universiade
20th-century American people
21st-century American people